Tavernier is a French occupational surname meaning innkeeper. Related surnames include Taverner, Tavenner, and Letavernier.

Notable people with the surname include:

 (1853–1945), French writer, art critic and journalist
Alexandra Tavernier (born 1993), French athlete specialist in hammer thrower
Alphonse Tavernier (1852–1933), French painter and Provençal poet
Ameet Tavernier (fl. 1583–1593), a printer in the Southern Netherlands
Bertrand Tavernier (1941–2021), French filmmaker
 (born 1955), electronic engineer
Christian Tavernier, composer
Christian Tavernier, Doctor (Oncology, Rheumatology)
Christian Tavernier, musician
Christian Tavernier, mercenary
Colo Tavernier, British and French screenwriter, wife of Bertrand Tavernier; see A Sunday in the Country
Émilie Tavernier (1800–1851), Religious, Educator and Blessed Canadian
 (1924–1996), Belgian nuclear physicist
James Tavernier (born 1991), English footballer (fullback)
 Janine Tavernier (born 1937), Former president of Union nationale des associations de défense des familles et de l'individu (National Union of Family and Individual Defense Associations)
 (1777–1850), French politician
Jean-Baptiste Tavernier (1605–1689), Traveler and French pioneer of trade with India
 (1749–1794), Farmer general French
 (born 1961), economist, senior French official, and head of the Institut national de la statistique et des études économiques (National Institute of Statistics and Economic Studies)
Jef Tavernier (born 1951), Flemish politician
Jules Tavernier (1844–1889), French painter
Nils Tavernier (born 1965), French film director, son of Bertrand Tavernier
Olivier Tavernier (born 1976), French archer; see 2016 World Indoor Archery Championships
Paul Tavernier (1852–1943), painter and pupil of Alexandre Cabanel
René Tavernier (geologist) (1914–1992), Belgian geologist and stratigrapher
René Tavernier (poet) (1915–1989), French writer and philosopher, father of Bertrand Tavernier
Tiffany Tavernier (born 1967), novelist, assistant screenwriter French director, daughter of Bertrand Tavernier; see It All Starts Today
Vincent Tavernier, scenic director; see Gérard Rancinan
Yves Tavernier (born 1937), French politician

See also
 (1894–1961), Belgian socialist politician
Tavernier (disambiguation)

References 

French-language surnames
Occupational surnames